Jarecki (feminine: Jarecka; plural: Jareccy) is a surname of Polish-language origin. It may refer to:

 Andrew Jarecki, American filmmaker
 Bogusław Jarecki (born 1957), Polish equestrian 
 Christopher Jarecki (born 1976), American musician and radio show host
 Carol Jarecki (1935–2021), American chess organizer and arbiter
 Dariusz Jarecki (born 1981), Polish footballer
 Eugene Jarecki (born 1969), American filmmaker
 Franciszek Jarecki (1931–2010), Polish pilot
 Henry Jarecki (born 1933), American psychiatrist
 Nicholas Jarecki (born 1979), American filmmaker
 Piotr Jarecki (born 1955), Polish prelate
 Richard Jarecki (1931–2018), German-American physician and professional gambler

See also
 

Polish-language surnames